Chishma (Şişmä) is a rural locality (a village) in Uguzevsky Selsoviet, Birsky District, Bashkortostan, Russia. The population was 24 as of 2010.

Geography 
It is located 23 km from Birsk and 2 km from Uguzevo.

References 

Rural localities in Birsky District